The London Society of Compositors was a British trade union, representing print workers in London.

History
The union was founded as the London Union of Compositors in 1834 by the merger of the London Trade Society of Compositors and the London General Trade Society of Compositors.  The following year, it was joined by the News Society of Compositors.  In 1845, the union was officially dissolved, its members designating it the South Eastern District of the National Typographical Association.  The national organisation collapsed, and the London group re-established itself as the "London Society of Compositors".

The union had a membership of over 10,000 by 1910, and attempted to expand outside London, but the Trades Union Congress instituted arbitration which limited it to a fifteen-mile radius of central London, the Typographical Association having rights to organise in the remainder of England.

In 1955, the Society merged with the Printing Machine Managers' Trade Society and was renamed the London Typographical Society.  In 1964, it merged with the Typographical Association to form the National Graphical Association.

Election results
The union sponsored Labour Party candidates in several Parliamentary elections, many of whom won election.

General Secretaries
1848: Edward Edwards
1850: John Boyett
1854: William Cox
1857: William Beckett
1863: Henry Self
1881: C. J. Drummond
1892: C. W. Bowerman
1906: Thomas Naylor
1938: Alfred M. Wall
1945: Robert Willis
1955: Robert Willis and Percy Astins
1956: Robert Willis

References

Arthur Marsh, Victoria Ryan and John B. Smethurst, Historical Directory of Trade Unions

External links
Catalogue of the LSC archives, held at the Modern Records Centre, University of Warwick
Catalogue of the PMMTS archives, held at the Modern Records Centre, University of Warwick
Catalogue of the LTS archives, held at the Modern Records Centre, University of Warwick

 
Organizations established in 1834
1964 disestablishments in the United Kingdom
Defunct trade unions of the United Kingdom
Typesetters
1834 establishments in the United Kingdom
Printing trade unions
Trade unions established in the 1830s
Trade unions disestablished in 1964
Trade unions based in London